Alain Joseph Dordelin (13 March 1764 - 19 May 1826), was an officer of the French Navy during the years of the Kingdom of France, French Republic and French Empire. He joined the Navy during the years of the Kingdom of France, serving in the American Revolutionary War and his career finished as a contre-amiral and a Comte of the First French Empire.

Biography
Born at Lorient, the son of an officer of the French East India Company, he enlisted on a voyage to China on the ship Duras and while in the East Indies volunteered for service with the French Navy on board the ship Sévère in the squadron of Suffren, fighting in several actions of the American Revolutionary War. Promoted to Lieutenant de vaisseau en 1786, he served on Dryade and in 1793 was promoted to Capitaine de vaisseau in command of Tyrannicide. He fought at the battle of the Glorious First of June, and later took part in the disastrous Expédition d'Irlande in the winter of 1796.

In 1799 he was promoted to contre-amiral and in 1804 was made a Commandeur Légion d'honneur. In 1810 he was granted the office of Préfet maritime at the French naval base of Brest and made a Comte of the First French Empire. Later moving to command the squadron in the Scheldt, he retired from the Navy in 1812.

External links
Société des Membres de la Légion d’Honneur  Biographie
 Armoiries sur archivesnationales.culture.gouv.fr
This article is based on a translation of an article from the French Wikipedia.

French Navy admirals
Counts of the First French Empire
French naval commanders of the Napoleonic Wars
Military personnel from Lorient
Commandeurs of the Légion d'honneur
1764 births
1826 deaths